Canadian Fisherman is a Canadian game fishing television series which aired on CBC Television in 1968.

Premise
This series featured game fishing throughout Canada from British Columbia to the Atlantic provinces.

Scheduling
This hour-long series was broadcast on Saturdays at 4:00 p.m. (Eastern) from 13 July to 14 September 1968.

References

External links
 

CBC Television original programming
1968 Canadian television series debuts
1968 Canadian television series endings